The Morotai slender-toed gecko (Nactus arceo) is a species of lizard in the family Gekkonidae. It is endemic to Indonesia.

References

Nactus
Reptiles of Indonesia
Reptiles described in 2020